Oaklands may refer to:

Places:
 Oaklands, Carmarthenshire, Wales
 Oaklands, Gauteng, a suburb of Johannesburg, South Africa
 Oaklands, Hertfordshire, England
 Oaklands, New South Wales, a town in Australia
 Oaklands, New Zealand, a suburb of Christchurch, New Zealand
 Oaklands, County Tyrone, a townland in County Tyrone, Northern Ireland
 Oaklands, a neighbourhood of Victoria, British Columbia in Canada

Institutions:
 Oaklands College, in Hertfordshire, England
 Oaklands Catholic School, in Hampshire, England

Historic houses:
 Oaklands (Gardiner, Maine)
 Oaklands (Laurel, Maryland)
 Oaklands (West Whiteland Township, Pennsylvania)
 Oaklands, a mansion that is today home to De La Salle College in Toronto
 Oaklands, a plantation estate in Murfreesboro, Tennessee, now operated as Oaklands Historic House Museum
Oaklands, Pambula, a heritage house in New South Wales, Australia

Related names:
 Oaklands Cemetery, in West Goshen Township, Pennsylvania
 Oaklands Park, South Australia
 Oaklands Junction, suburb of Melbourne, Australia
 Oaklands railway station, Adelaide, South Australia

See also
 Oakland (disambiguation)